The 2009 Individual Speedway Australian Championship was the 2009 version of the Individual Speedway Australian Championship organised by Motorcycling Australia. The three final rounds took place between 3 January and 10 January. The championship was won by Leigh Adams, who beat the defending champion Chris Holder into second place. Rory Schlein finished third.

By winning the 2009 Australian Solo Championship, Leigh Adams won his record 10th Australian title which he had first won in 1992. Adams was undefeated through the three rounds held at the Newcastle Showgrounds, Olympic Park Speedway, and Gillman Speedway.

Qualification 
 Qualification
 2 January, 2009
  Gosford, NSW - Gosford Speedway
 Referee: 
 Qualification: the top six riders and two track reserves.

Finals 
Ten riders were seeded through to the finals:
 Leigh Adams
 Troy Batchelor
 Jason Doyle
 Cory Gathercole
 Josh Grajczonek
 Chris Holder
 Tyron Proctor
 Rory Schlein
 Davey Watt
 Cameron Woodward

Newcastle 
 Round one
 3 January, 2009
  Newcastle, NSW - Newcastle Showgrounds
 Referee:

Mildura 
 Round two
 7 January, 2009
  Mildura, Victoria - Olympic Park Speedway
 Referee:

Gillman 
 Round three
 10 January, 2009
  Gillman, South Australia - Gillman Speedway
 Referee:

The intermediate classification

References

See also 
 Australian Individual Speedway Championship
 Australia national speedway team
 Sports in Australia

Australia